Arash Keshavarzi (born 1987 in Tehran) is a volleyball player from Iran, who plays as an outside hitter for the Men's National Team and Shahrdari Tabriz in Iranian Volleyball Super League. He is of Iranian Azerbaijani descent. Arash Keshavarzi has been a member of the national volleyball team in 2013, 2014 and 2015 World League.

References

Living people
1987 births
Iranian Azerbaijanis
People from Tehran
Iranian men's volleyball players
Asian Games silver medalists for Iran
Asian Games medalists in volleyball
Volleyball players at the 2010 Asian Games
Medalists at the 2010 Asian Games
21st-century Iranian people